The 1895 Chicago Physicians and Suregons football team was an American football team that represented the University of Illinois College of Medicine in the 1895 college football season. In the football team's first year of existence the Surgeons achieved a 3–2–1 record and outscored their opponents 76 or 82 to 58.

Schedule

References

Chicago Physicians and Surgeons
Chicago Physicians and Surgeons football seasons
Chicago Physicians and Surgeons football